"Ekusher Gaan" ( "The Song of Twentyfirst"), more popularly known (after its first line) as "Amar Bhaier Rokte Rangano" ( "My Brothers' Blood Spattered") is a Bengali song written by Abdul Gaffar Choudhury to mark the Bengali Language Movement in 1952 East Pakistan. It was first published anonymously in the last page of a newspaper with the headline Ekusher Gaan, but was later published in Ekusheys February edition.
 
The song was initially written as a poem at the bedside of an injured language movement activist who was shot by the Pakistani military police. The cultural secretary of the Jubo League gave the poem to Abdul Latif to put to a tune, which Latif Atikul Islam first sang. The students of Dhaka College also sung the song when they attempted to build a Shaheed Minar on their college premises, getting them expelled from the college. Altaf Mahmud, a renowned composer and a martyr of the Bangladesh Liberation War, recomposed the song using Abdul Latif's version, which is now a quasi-official tune.

The song is often recognized as the most influential song of the language movement, reminding numerous Bangladeshis about the conflicts of 1952. Every 21 February sees people from all parts of the Bangladesh heading to the Shaheed Minar in the probhat feri, a barefoot march to the monument, paying homage to those killed in the language movement demonstrations by singing this song. It is regarded by the listeners of BBC Bengali Service as the third best song in Bengali.

The English translation below was rendered by Kabir Chowdhury.

Lyrics

Citations

References
  

Bengali-language literature
Bangladeshi music
Bangladeshi patriotic songs
Bangladeshi songs
Bengali-language songs
Bengali language movement
Songs about language
History of Pakistan